Barney Francis Spott was a member of the Wisconsin State Assembly.

Biography
Spott was born on January 14, 1898, in Milwaukee, Wisconsin. He attended La Salle Extension University. During World War I, Spott served in the United States Army. Spott was in the banking and insurance business. He died on March 31, 1975.

Political career
Spott was a member of the Assembly from 1927 to 1929. He was a Republican.

References

Politicians from Milwaukee
Businesspeople from Milwaukee
Republican Party members of the Wisconsin State Assembly
Military personnel from Wisconsin
United States Army soldiers
United States Army personnel of World War I
La Salle Extension University alumni
1898 births
1975 deaths
20th-century American politicians
20th-century American businesspeople